Alan Fletcher Goulty  (born 2 July 1947) is a retired British diplomat.

Goulty graduated with a Modern History degree from Oxford in 1968 and joined the Foreign Office the same year. He attended MECAS from 1969 to 1971. After a number of posts in the Middle East and North Africa Goulty became Ambassador to Sudan (1995-1999) and later Ambassador to Tunisia (2004-2008).

Since 2013 he has been a Global Fellow at the Woodrow Wilson International Center for Scholars.

Honours
  Companion of the Order of St Michael and St George (CMG) - 1998

References

Living people
1947 births
Members of HM Diplomatic Service
Alumni of Corpus Christi College, Oxford
Companions of the Order of St Michael and St George
20th-century British diplomats